The British ambassador to South Korea is in charge of the United Kingdom's diplomatic mission to South Korea. The official title is His Britannic Majesty's Ambassador to the Republic of Korea (ROK).

History
Under the Imperial Chinese tributary system, Korea was a tributary state to China. After the United Kingdom–Korea Treaty of 1883 British Ministers to China were appointed as "Her Majesty's Envoy Extraordinary and Minister Plenipotentiary to His Majesty the Emperor of China, and also Her Majesty's Envoy Extraordinary and Minister Plenipotentiary to His Majesty the King of Corea." Britain also appointed consul-generals to be resident in Seoul, but they were not heads of mission, as the head of mission was the minister in Peking (now Beijing). In 1898, following the First Sino-Japanese War (1894–95), the Korean Empire became independent of China, and Britain appointed a chargé d'affaires who became Minister Resident when the United Kingdom and Korea exchanged envoys in 1901.

Consul-General in Seoul

British representative to Joseon (until 1897) and later Korean Empire (after 1897).

1884–1885: William George Aston
1889–1896: Walter Hillier
1896–1898: John Jordan

Head of mission to Korea

Minister to China, non-resident Minister to Korea

Holders were station in Beijing.

1884–1885: Sir Harry Smith Parkes
1885–1892: Sir John Walsham, 2nd Baronet
1892–1895: Sir Nicholas O'Conor
1896–1898: Sir Claude MacDonald

Chargé d'affaires
1898–1901: John Jordan

Minister Resident
1901–1905: Sir John Jordan

Under the Japan–Korea Treaty of 1905 Korea became a protectorate of Japan, and Britain and other countries withdrew diplomatic missions from Seoul. After World War II Japan's rule ended and Korea was occupied by the Soviet Union and United States, resulting in division of Korea between the Democratic People's Republic of Korea (North Korea) and the Republic of Korea (South Korea).

Korea under Japanese rule

From 1910 to 1945 Korea was under Dependent territory of the Empire of Japan, thus no longer required a diplomatic mission.

Head of mission to South Korea

The current mission represents South Korea, while the ambassador for North Korea did not exist until 2000.

Envoy Extraordinary and Minister Plenipotentiary
1949–1954: Captain Vyvyan Holt (consul-general from 1948).
1954–1956: Charles Stewart
1957: Hubert Evans

Ambassador Extraordinary and Plenipotentiary
1957–1961: Hubert Evans
1961–1966: Sir Walter Godfrey
1967–1969: Ian Clayton Mackenzie
1969–1971: Nigel Trench
1971–1974: Jeffrey Petersen
1975–1980: William Bates
1980–1983: John Morgan
1983–1986: Nicholas Spreckley
1986–1990: Lawrence Middleton
1990–1993: David Wright
1994–1997: Thomas Harris
1997–2000: Sir Stephen Brown
2000–2003: Charles Humfrey
2003–2008: Warwick Morris
2008–2011: Martin Uden 
2011–2015: Scott Wightman
2015–2018: Charles Hay

2018–: Simon Smith
2022 -: Colin Crooks

See also
 List of diplomatic missions of the United Kingdom
 List of diplomatic missions in South Korea
 List of ambassadors of the United Kingdom to North Korea

Notes

References
 Korean Mission to the Conference on the Limitation of Armament, Washington, D.C., 1921-1922. (1922). Korea's Appeal to the Conference on Limitation of Armament. Washington: U.S. Government Printing Office. OCLC 12923609

External links
UK and South Korea, gov.uk

Korea South
 
United Kingdom